Mercallo is a comune (municipality) in the Province of Varese in the Italian region Lombardy, located about  northwest of Milan and about  southwest of Varese.

Mercallo borders the following municipalities: Comabbio, Sesto Calende, Varano Borghi, Vergiate.

Demographic evolution

References

Cities and towns in Lombardy